Dicrocoeliidae is a family of flatworms belonging to the order Plagiorchiida.

Genera
Genera:
 Allocorrigia Turner & Corkum, 1977
 Athesmia Looss, 1899
 Brachydistomum  , 1944
 Brachylecithum Shtrom, 1940
 Brodenia Gedoelst, 1913
 Caballerolecythus Lamothe-Argumedo, Falcón-Ordaz, García-Prieto & Fernández-Fernández, 2005
 Concinnum Bhalerao, 1936
 Conspicuum Bhalerao, 1936
 Controrchis Price, 1928
 Corrigia Shtrom, 1940
 Dicrocoelium Dujardin, 1845
 Dictyonograptus Travassos, 1919
 Euparadistomum Tubangui, 1931
 Eurytrema Looss, 1907
 Infidum Travassos, 1916
 Lubens Bhalerao, 1936
 Lubens Travassos, 1920
 Lutztrema Travassos, 1941
 Lyperosomum Looss, 1899
 Paradistomum Kossack, 1910
 Platynosomum Looss, 1907
 Pojmanskatrema Hildebrand & Tkach, 2019
 Proacetabulorchis Gogate, 1940
 Prosolecithus Yamaguti, 1971
 Pseudoparadistomum Roca, 2003
 Robertdigenea Caballero y Caballero & Caballero, 1970
 Skrjabinus Bhalerao, 1936
 Stromitrema Skrjabin, 1944
 Unilaterilecithum Oschmarin, 1952
 Yungasicola Gardner & Perez-Ponce De Leon, 2002
 Zonorchis Travassos, 1944

References

Plagiorchiida